Rudnik is a village in Gmina Hażlach, Cieszyn County, Silesian Voivodeship, southern Poland. It has a population of 479 (2017).

The name of the village is derived from a name of a local stream Rudnik, mentioned as early as 1442 (do potoka jmenem Rudnika), which is a transformation of a word rudy, meaning rdzawy (rusty).

History
It lies in the historical region of Cieszyn Silesia. Up to recently it was stated that the village was first mentioned in 1566 as Rudnik, however another documents exists issued by Wenceslaus III Adam, Duke of Cieszyn on 5 November 1608 which retrospectively affirms another document from 1523 that mentioned the village among others obliged to consume ale produced only in Cieszyn. Politically the village belonged then to the Duchy of Teschen, a fee of the Kingdom of Bohemia, which after 1526 became part of the Habsburg monarchy.

After World War I, the fall of Austria-Hungary, the Polish–Czechoslovak War and the division of Cieszyn Silesia in 1920, it became a part of Poland. It was then annexed by Nazi Germany at the beginning of World War II. After the war it was restored to Poland.

Geography 

It is drained by several streams, left tributaries of the Knajka, in the watershed of Vistula.

References

Villages in Cieszyn County
Cieszyn Silesia